Geraldine Namirembe Bitamazire is a Ugandan academic and politician. She is the Chancellor of the Uganda Management Institute. She was minister of education from 1979 to 1980 and again from 2005 to 2011. She also served as the member of parliament representing Mpigi District women in the Ugandan Parliament from 2001 to 2011.

Background and education
She was born on 17 July 1941 in the Central Region of Uganda. Bitamazire attended Trinity College Nabbingo for her high school education. She went on to obtain a Diploma in education from Makerere University in 1964. She followed that with a Bachelor of Arts degree in 1967 and a Master of Arts degree in 1987, both from Makerere University.

Career
From 1971 to 1973, she served as a director of the East African Harbors Corporation, part of the first East African Community. She also served as the headteacher of the Tororo Girls School from 1971 to 1974. From 1974 to 1979, she served as a senior education officer in Uganda's Ministry of Education and Sports. In 1979, she was appointed minister of education, serving in that capacity until 1980. From 1981 until 1996, Bitamazire was the deputy chairperson of the Teaching Service Commission. She was appointed as minister of state for education in 1999, serving in that capacity until 2005, when she was appointed minister of education and sports. In 2010, Mpigi District was split into three parts; Butambala District, Gomba District, and the smaller Mpigi District of today. During the 2011 national elections, Bitamazire was defeated in the primaries by Mariam Nalubega, also of the National Resistance Movement (NRM) political party, in Butambala District. In the cabinet reshuffle of 27 May 2011, Bitamazire was dropped from the cabinet and was replaced by Jessica Alupo.

Bitamazire currently serves as the chancellor of the Uganda Management Institute, a public, degree-awarding, tertiary institution of higher education, with accreditation equivalent to a university.

Personal life

Bitamazire is married to Alphonce Bitamazire of the Uganda People's Defence Force. She belongs to the NRM political party. She was a member of the United Nations Commission on the Status of Women from 1998 to 2001 and is a founding member of the Forum for African Women Educationalists.

See also
 List of university leaders in Uganda

References

External links
  Website of the Parliament of Uganda

1941 births
Living people
People from Butambala District
Makerere University alumni
Members of the Parliament of Uganda
National Resistance Movement politicians
Ugandan educators
20th-century Ugandan women politicians
20th-century Ugandan politicians
21st-century Ugandan women politicians
21st-century Ugandan politicians
Academic staff of Uganda Management Institute
Women government ministers of Uganda
Women members of the Parliament of Uganda
People educated at Trinity College Nabbingo
Government ministers of Uganda